The 1965–66 season of the European Cup football club tournament was won by Real Madrid, winners of the first five European Cups from 1956 to 1960, for the sixth time in a close final against Partizan. Real Madrid eliminated title-holders Internazionale in the semi-finals.

Preliminary round

|}
Note: Starting in the 1963–64 tournament, only the title holder, Internazionale, joined directly in the first round. They were the only Italian team to enter, while Cyprus re-entered its champion thus keeping the number of participants at 31.

First leg

Second leg

Real Madrid won 6–2 on aggregate.

Kilmarnock won 1–0 on aggregate.

Anderlecht won 5–1 on aggregate.

Derry City won 8–6 on aggregate.

Panathinaikos won 4–2 on aggregate.

Ferencváros won 13–2 on aggregate.

Dinamo București won 7–2 on aggregate.

Manchester United won 9–2 on aggregate.

Vorwärts Berlin won 3–1 on aggregate.

Benfica won 18–0 on aggregate.

Levski Sofia won 7–2 on aggregate.

Sparta Prague won 4–0 on aggregate.

Górnik Zabrze won 5–2 on aggregate.

Werder Bremen won 10–0 on aggregate.

Partizan won 4–2 on aggregate.

Bracket

First round

|}

First leg

Second leg

Anderlecht won 9–0 on aggregate.

Real Madrid won 7–3 on aggregate.

Internazionale won 3–2 on aggregate.

Ferencváros won 3–1 on aggregate.

Sparta Prague won 5–1 on aggregate.

Partizan won 3–1 on aggregate.

Manchester United won 5–1 on aggregate.

Benfica won 5–4 on aggregate.

Quarter-finals

|}

First leg

Second leg

Real Madrid won 4–3 on aggregate.

Internazionale won 5–1 on aggregate.

Partizan won 6–4 on aggregate.

Manchester United won 8–3 on aggregate.

Semi-finals

|}

First leg

Second leg

Real Madrid won 2–1 on aggregate.

Partizan won 2–1 on aggregate.

Final

Top scorers
The top scorers from the 1965–66 European Cup (including preliminary round) are as follows:

References

External links
1965–66 All matches – season at UEFA website
European Cup results at Rec.Sport.Soccer Statistics Foundation
 All scorers 1965–66 European Cup (excluding preliminary round) according to protocols UEFA 
1965/66 European Cup – results and line-ups (archive)
Y. Lander, European Cups History, part 1 (Kharkiv, 2003) – some attendance data.

1965–66 in European football
European Champion Clubs' Cup seasons